Wilhelm Schmid (30 March 1921 – 5 October 1980) was an Austrian ice hockey player. He competed in the men's tournament at the 1956 Winter Olympics.

References

External links
 

1921 births
1980 deaths
Austrian ice hockey players
Olympic ice hockey players of Austria
Ice hockey players at the 1956 Winter Olympics
Sportspeople from Innsbruck